The 1949–50 season was Arsenal's 31st consecutive season in the top division of English football. They would finish sixth in the league but only four points off champions Portsmouth, with Peter Goring top scoring with 21 Division 1 goals, with Joe Mercer winning the FWA Player of the Year. That season, Arsenal would first have their new crest—emblazoned with the motto "Victoria Concordia Crescit ("Victory Grows Through Harmony")—used on official club publications. In the FA Cup, Arsenal won the first four ties at Highbury before beating Chelsea after a replay to set up a final against Liverpool. The Gunners would dominate the final and win 2–0 thanks to Reg Lewis' double, his fourth and fifth FA Cup goals that season, as Arsenal claimed the cup for the third time in their history—having played every match in London. The club's biggest win in all competitions was 6–0 against Sunderland in the league; in all competitions, Reg Lewis scored the most goals, netting 24.

Results
Arsenal's score comes first

Legend

Football League First Division

Final League table

FA Cup

Arsenal entered the FA Cup in the third round, in which they were drawn to face Sheffield Wednesday.

See also

 1949–50 in English football
 List of Arsenal F.C. seasons

References

1949-50
English football clubs 1949–50 season